Acta Geotechnica is a bimonthly peer-reviewed engineering journal published by Springer. The editor-in-chief is Wei Wu (University of Natural Resources and Life Sciences, Vienna). The other two editors of the journal are: Ronaldo Borja (Stanford, USA), and Jian Chu (Singapore).

Acta Geotechnica covers fundamental and applied research in geotechnical engineering, including mining, tunneling, dam engineering, as well as geohazard, geoenvironmental, and petroleum engineering. Publishing formats include research papers, review articles, short notes, and letters to the editors. This journal is among the top journals in the field of Geotechnical engineering.

Abstracting and indexing 
The journal was started in 2006 and was included in SCI in 2010. The Impact Factor for 2020 is 5.8, which is the 1nd place among the 35 SCI journals in the category of "Engineering Geological". The journal is abstracted and indexed in:
 Current Contents/Engineering, Computing and Technology
 SCI
 Scopus
 Inspec
 EBSCO databases
 CSA Illumina
 Academic OneFile
 GeoRef
 VINITI Database RAS 
According to the Journal Citation Reports, the journal has a 2020 impact factor of 5.8.

References

External links 
 

Springer Science+Business Media academic journals
Publications established in 2006
Bimonthly journals
Hybrid open access journals
English-language journals
Mining journals